Ennemond Alexandre Petitot (1727-1801) was a French-born architect, mainly active in the Duchy of Parma.

Biography
He was born in Lyon in 1727, and by 1741, he had joined the studio of the architect Jacques Soufflot. From there he moved to study at the Académie d'Architecture in Paris. From there he moved under a grant to study architecture in Rome, and was there recruited by the prime minister Guillaume du Tillot to become the architect of the recently installed Bourbon Dukes in Parma.

His projects envisioning updating the Duchy along the lines of the Neoclassical style regnant in France. Many of his ambitious projects have either been reduced, razed, or remained unfinished. He also published series of engravings on various designs for architectural decoration. Among his architectural projects in the Duchy of Parma
Venaria (Ducal hunting lodge) at Colorno (1753)
Apartments (1755) and staircase for Ducal Palace of Colorno
Sculptural Vases for Ducal Garden in Parma (1754), collaboration with the French sculptor Jean Baptiste Boudard (1710-1768) similar to those found in gardens at Palace of Versailles
Loggia at theater at Ducal Palace of Parma with Boudard (1760)
Facade of the church of San Pietro (1761-1762)
Plans for boulevard-promenade (1763) along what is now Stradone Martiri della Liberta (at the time, he name had changed from the Stradone Farnese to Stradone Borbone); it was to be marked at the ends by two architectural units: 
At the Western end, ant the intersection with Strada Firini, a Colonna Borbone (Bourbon column), a 90-foot monumental free-standing doric column topped by Bourbon coat of arms
At the Eastern end, the still-extant Casino del Caffè, now Casino Petitot designed as fashionable meeting spot, but now somewhat isolated in a traffic circle
Ara Amicitiae monument (1769, since destroyed)
Designs for Biblioteca Palatina (1766), completed by Drugman
Temple of Arcadia in the Gardens of Colorno (1769)

With the fall of minister du Tillot, and later the dislocations occurring Northern Italy after the French Revolution, the influence and scope of commissions for Petitot waned. He kept a teaching appointment at the Academy of Fine Arts of Parma.

References

18th-century French architects
18th-century Italian architects
Architects from Lyon
Italian neoclassical architects
Prix de Rome for architecture
1727 births
1801 deaths